Lucky Luke is a 1991 Italian-American Western comedy film directed by and starring Terence Hill and based on the Belgian comic book of the same name. It is also the pilot episode of the Lucky Luke television series.

It was shot in Bonanza Creek Ranch and Santa Fe (New Mexico), Zia Pueblo, Valles Caldera National Preserve, White Sands National Monument and La Junta (Colorado), and Tucson, Arizona.

Plot 
Lucky Luke becomes the sheriff of Daisy Town and runs out all the criminals. Then the Dalton brothers arrive and try to get the Indians to break the peace treaty and attack the town.

Cast 
 Terence Hill as Lucky Luke
 Nancy Morgan as Lotta Legs
 Roger Miller as Jolly Jumper (voice)
 Fritz Sperberg as Averell Dalton
 Dominic Barto as William Dalton
 Bo Greigh as Jack Dalton
 Ron Carey as Joe Dalton
 Arsenio Trinidad as Ming Li Fu
 Mark Hardwick as Hank
 Neil Summers as Virgil
 Buff Douthitt as the mayor

Soundtrack
The opening theme of the movie is the song "Lucky Luke Rides Again", performed by Roger Miller. The main theme is the song "The Lonesomest Cowboy in the West", performed by Arlo Guthrie.

Reception
CineMagazine rated the film 2 stars.

References

External links
 Lucky Luke at the Internet Movie Database

1990s Western (genre) comedy films
Lucky Luke films
Italian Western (genre) comedy films
Spaghetti Western films
1990s Italian-language films
English-language Italian films
1990s English-language films
Films directed by Terence Hill
Films based on Belgian comics
Live-action films based on comics
Films shot in Tucson, Arizona
Films shot in Colorado
Films shot in New Mexico
1991 multilingual films
Italian multilingual films
1990s Italian films
Foreign films set in the United States